The VI Corps of the Ottoman Empire (Turkish: 6 ncı Kolordu or Altıncı Kolordu) was one of the corps of the Ottoman Army. It was formed in the early 20th century during Ottoman military reforms. It is most notable for its participation in the offensive phase of the 1916 Romanian Campaign of World War I, where it was involved in heavy action all throughout the five months, inflicting heavy casualties on the Russo-Romanians and breaking through the Allied lines in several key areas. Additionally the VI Corps took 8,512 prisoners in Romania, including 6,512 Russians and 2,000 Romanians.

Formation

Order of Battle, 1911 
With further reorganizations of the Ottoman Army, to include the creation of corps level headquarters, by 1911 the VI Corps was headquartered in Salonika. The Corps before the First Balkan War in 1911 was structured as such:

VI Corps, Monastir
16th Infantry Division, İştip
46th Infantry Regiment, İştip
47th Infantry Regiment, Koçana
48th Infantry Regiment, Köprülü
16th Rifle Battalion, İştip
16th Field Artillery Regiment, İştip
16th Division Band, İştip
17th Infantry Division, Monastir
49th Infantry Regiment, Monastir
50th Infantry Regiment, Monastir
51st Infantry Regiment, Monastir
17th Rifle Battalion, Resne
17th Field Artillery Regiment, Monastir
17th Division Band, Monastir
18th Infantry Division, Debre
52nd Infantry Regiment, Debre
53rd Infantry Regiment, Kırçova
54th Infantry Regiment, Elbasan
18th Rifle Battalion, Debre
18th Field Artillery Regiment, Monastir
18th Division Band, Debre
Units of VI Corps
6th Rifle Regiment, Monastir
7th Cavalry Brigade, Monastir
6th Cavalry Regiment, Monastir
16th Cavalry Regiment, İştip
13th Horse Artillery Regiment, Pirlepe
3rd Horse Artillery Battalion, Monastir
2nd Mountain Artillery Battalion, Monastir
8th Mountain Artillery Battalion, Monastir
9th Mountain Artillery Battalion, Elbasan
5th Field Howitzer Battalion, Monastir
6th Engineer Battalion, Köprülü
6th Telegraph Battalion, Monastir
6th Transport Battalion, Monastir
Border companies x 2

Balkan Wars

Order of Battle, October 19, 1912 
On October 19, 1912, the corps was structured as follows:

VI Corps (Serbian Front, under the command of the Vardar Army of the Western Army)
17th Division, 18th Division, 16th Division
Manastir Redif Division, Drama Redif Division

Order of Battle, July 1913 
VI Corps (Anatolia)
16th Division

World War I

Order of Battle, August 1914, November 1914 
In August 1914, November 1914, the corps was structured as follows:

VI Corps (Thrace)
16th Division, 26th Division

Order of Battle, Late April 1915, Late Summer 1915, January 1916 
In Late April 1915, Late Summer 1915, January 1916, the corps was structured as follows:

VI Corps (Thrace)
16th Division, 24th Division, 26th Division

Order of Battle, August 1916 
In August 1916, the corps was structured as follows:

VI Corps (Romania)
15th Division, 25th Division

Order of Battle, December 1916, August 1917 
In December 1916, August 1917, the corps was structured as follows:

VI Corps (Romania)
15th Division, 25th Division, 26th Division

Order of Battle, June 1918 
VI Corps (Caucasus)
3rd Division, 36th Infantry Division

Sources

See also 
Romania during World War I
First Battle of Cobadin
Second Battle of Cobadin

Corps of the Ottoman Empire
Military units and formations of the Ottoman Empire in the Balkan Wars
Military units and formations of the Ottoman Empire in World War I
Macedonia under the Ottoman Empire
Romania in World War I
History of Dobruja
1911 establishments in the Ottoman Empire